The Mascota jumprock (Moxostoma mascotae) is a species of ray-finned fish in the genus Moxostoma.

References

 

Moxostoma
Fish described in 1907